Ruben Padilla (born January 5, 2001) is an American trampoline gymnast.

Career
Padilla competed at the 2018 Trampoline Gymnastics World Championships where he won a silver medal in the men's double mini event. In 2019, he also won the silver medal in this event.

He won a bronze medal in the men's individual event at the 2019 Pan American Games.

He competed in the men's double mini-trampoline event at the 2022 World Games.

He competed at the 2022 Trampoline Gymnastics World Championships where he won a gold medal in the men's double mini, a silver medal in the all-around team and a bronze medal in the double mini team event.

References

External links 
 

Living people
2001 births
Place of birth missing (living people)
American male trampolinists
Pan American Games medalists in gymnastics
Pan American Games bronze medalists for the United States
Medalists at the 2019 Pan American Games
Gymnasts at the 2019 Pan American Games
Medalists at the Trampoline Gymnastics World Championships
Competitors at the 2022 World Games
21st-century American people